Camp General Emilio Aguinaldo (CGEA), also known as Camp Aguinaldo, is the site of the general headquarters (GHQ) of the Armed Forces of the Philippines (AFP) located in eastern Metro Manila, the Philippines.

It is located in Quezon City along EDSA, a major thoroughfare of the metropolis, to which it is across Camp Crame, the national headquarters (NHQ) of the Philippine National Police (PNP). The military installation is named after Philippine revolutionary leader Emilio Aguinaldo, who became the first Philippine president and fought in the Philippine Revolution, the Spanish–American War, and the Philippine–American War.

Land
The company had originally acquired these lands as estate holdings from the Augustinian Order, such as the Hacienda de Mandaluyon.

Camp Aguinaldo occupies  of this total area, of which  hectares were purchased by the government and the remaining  hectares were donated by Ortigas and Company.

History

Camp Aguinaldo was established on January 11, 1935, as Camp Murphy, including Zablan Field, which acted as an airstrip. It was named in honor of the first American High Commissioner to the Philippines Frank Murphy. It was renamed Camp General Emilio Aguinaldo in 1965, after the first president of the Philippines. The Philippine Constabulary General Service Battalion was the first to use the camp in January 1935. In December of that year, the National Defense Act paved the way for the formation of the Philippine Army. It also designated the Philippine Constabulary as the Army Constabulary Division, which maintains its peacekeeping mission under the DND.

In June 1938, the Army Constabulary Division was separated from the Philippine Army and was reformed to become the National Police Force under the Department of Interior.

After World War II, Camp Murphy was divided into two camps—Camp Crame and Camp Aguinaldo. The Zablan Field's former Japanese runways now forms the roads of White Plains Avenue and a portion of Katipunan Avenue, just in front of White Plains subdivisions.

On November 21, 2013, Civic Groups and Volunteers were to be transferred to Camp Emilio Aguinaldo from Villamor Air Base in Pasay. It was done to give more storage spaces for those who were part of Oplan Salubong. All relief supports including food, medical and transportation services were to be transferred to Camp Aguinaldo together with the DSWD in the benefit of Typhoon Yolanda survivors.

In March 2019, the DOTr announced that the Katipunan station of the Metro Manila Subway is planned to be built underneath a portion of the camp's property, along the intersection of Katipunan Avenue and Col. Bonny Serrano Avenue, in order to boost property values in the area and generate investments for the government .

Barangay

The military installation is situated in its own administrative division as a barangay of Quezon City, known as Barangay Camp Aguinaldo. Prior to this, Camp Aguinaldo was part of Barangay Socorro until the namesake barangay was created through Executive Order No. 29 signed by Mayor Norberto S. Amoranto on June 25, 1975. At the time of creation, the barangay had 250 households and a voting population of 800 people. 

The land boundaries of Barangay Camp Aguinaldo are defined by Boni Serrano Avenue (formerly known as Santolan Road) to the north, EDSA to the west, White Plains Avenue to the south, and the eastern perimeter of the base to the east.  Some non-military establishments can be found near the northern boundary with Barangay Socorro along Boni Serrano Avenue, such as the Saint Ignatius de Loyola Parish Church and the Camp General Emilio Aguinaldo High School.

Its barangay hall can be located at the intersection of Road 3 and Gozar Street.

See also
Philippine Constabulary
Philippine Military Academy
Military history of the Philippines
Military history of the Philippines during World War II

References
Citations

Bibliography

 Official Page of the Armed Forces of the Philippines
 Pobre, Cesar P. (2006). History of the Armed Forces of the Filipino People. New Day Publishers..

External links
Camp Aguinaldo Official website
Armed Forces of the Philippines
Camp Murphy, Zablan Airfield, Camp Aguinaldo Pacific Wrecks.org

Aguinaldo
Buildings and structures in Quezon City
Barangays of Metro Manila